The Hassan Bek Mosque, also known as the Hasan Bey Mosque, is one of the most well-known mosques of Jaffa, Tel Aviv, Israel. 

The mosque was built in 1916 at the northern boundary of Arab Jaffa, and its history is closely bound up with the various stages of the Arab-Jewish conflict.

Its Ottoman-style architecture contrasts with the surrounding contemporary modern high-rises. It is located between the Neve Tzedek neighbourhood of Tel Aviv and the Mediterranean Sea, on the road to Jaffa.

History and Construction

The mosque was built in 1916, by Jaffa's Ottoman governor of the same name. At the time, Jaffa and the recently founded Tel Aviv were both competitively expanding. The mosque was part of Manshiyya, Jaffa's northernmost neighbourhood which spread northwards along the Mediterranean seashore.

The governor of Jaffa who had the mosque built is named as Hassan Bey or Bek, or Hassan Bey al-Basri aljabi , حسن بيك الجابي. Hassan Bey headed Jaffa between August 1914 and May 1916.

The mosque was built on a plot of land selected and bought by Hassan Bey from its Arab owner.

1948 war

The mosque's minaret was often used by Arab snipers to shoot at Jewish forces in Tel Aviv and Manshiya, in the months preceding the British withdrawal.

After the demolition of Manshiya
The place of the razed Arab housing was taken by high-rise office buildings and a park. The Hassan Bek Mosque - spared due to the state and municipal authorities hesitating to be seen as desecrating a Muslim house of worship - remained, together with the building now housing the Irgun Museum of Tel Aviv, the last two remnants of the area's pre-1948 Manshiya neighbourhood.

Real-estate scheme of 1979
The Hassan Bek Mosque lay derelict and neglected for many years, its empty shell used on some occasions by vagabonds and drug addicts.

In 1979, it was announced that the Jaffa Islamic Properties' Trustees had sold the mosque and its compound to real-estate developer Gershon Peres (brother of Shimon Peres, then Israeli Labor Party leader and former President of Israel) and that it was to be transformed into a shopping mall.

The disclosure aroused a storm of protests by Israeli Arabs, supported by Israeli Jewish peace and human rights groups, who claimed that the Trustees had been appointed by the Government of Israel, that they did not represent the Muslim community of Jaffa, and that they had pilfered the money from the Peres deal into their own pockets.

The outcome was that the real estate deal was cancelled and the mosque returned to the hands of the Jaffa Muslim Community.

Minaret collapse and reconstruction

The authorities gave permission for the Jaffa Arabs to restore the minaret, using volunteer work and funds provided by the governments of Jordan and Saudi Arabia. This is considered by Jaffa Arabs an important milestone in their recovered self-awareness and assertiveness in defence of their communal rights.

The reconstructed minaret is twice as tall as the original one.

Up to the present, Jaffa Arabs maintain an ongoing presence in the renovated mosque, and prayers are held in it regularly, though it is a considerable distance from the neighbourhood where the Muslim community of Jaffa is living.

Description
The Ottoman-style mosque initially measured 21 by 28 metres, was well-proportioned and fit well into the Al-Manshiya neighbourhood. It had a courtyard partially paved and in part used as a garden; the prayer hall was entered by a staircase on its northern side. In 1923 the mosque was already the object of politically motivated renovations ordered by the Supreme Muslim Council, and its overall area was substantially expanded in the 1980s.

The mosque employs a white limestone instead of using the more common stone of the area, kurkar, a yellow-brown calcareous sandstone. The walls of the mosque are perforated with intricately decorated and colourfully glazed windows. The walls are also refined by narrow engaged piers that divide the wide façades into smaller sections.

The current minaret was rebuilt at twice its original height as part of the renovation in the 1980s; extremely tall and slender, it contrasts with the square prayer hall. A very low tower rises on the opposite side of the mosque. The concrete roof is flat and proportionally low, with a shallow dome over the central bay.

References

Arab Israeli culture in Tel Aviv
Mosques completed in 1916
Mosques in Tel Aviv
Mosque-related controversies
History of Palestine (region)
Mosque buildings with domes
Ottoman architecture in Israel
Jaffa